Kotaro Umeji is a  Japanese graphic designer. He has shaped the image of U-1 and other characters from the video game Gitaroo Man for the PlayStation 2 video game console and Gitaroo Man Lives! for the PlayStation Portable video game console, and the characters and art found in Osu! Tatakae! Ouendan  and Elite Beat Agents both for the Nintendo DS video game console.

List of works

 Gitaroo Man (2002), KOEI Corporation
 Osu! Tatakae! Ouendan (2005), Nintendo Co., Ltd.
 Gitaroo Man Lives! (2006), KOEI Co., Ltd.
 Elite Beat Agents (2006), Nintendo of America Inc.

External links
 iNiS Corporation — iNiS Corporation official website

Living people
Year of birth missing (living people)